Emilia Ares is an Armenian-American film and television actress, producer, and award-winning author. Her debut coming of age, contemporary fiction novel, Love and Other Sins, encompasses complex family dynamics, immigration, child abuse, the aftermath of trauma and first love.

Early life
She was born in Armenia and moved to Los Angeles, California as a child, where she toured locally and internationally with a dance company since she was 5 years old. Ares graduated from Palisades Charter High School with honors. She graduated from UCLA with a BA in economics and minored in Russian language. Ares also completed several courses on the history of film.

Ares finished as 1st Runner-up in Miss Global 2013 beauty pageant, representing Armenia.

Career

Advertisements
Ares is most recently recognized for her national Verizon spot featuring Thomas Middleditch and national Jergens campaign featuring Leslie Mann for Jergens Wet Skin Moisturizer.

She has appeared in many ads some of which include appearances for Apple, Sony, Coca-Cola, and a PSA called "Time" for the American Academy of Dermatology.

Film
Ares made her film debut in Falling Overnight (2010) as Chloe Webb, a young photographer who meets and develops a relationship with Elliot Carson (Parker Croft) on the day before he has surgery to remove a malignant brain tumor. Subsequently, Ares has worked on several film projects, including V/H/S: Viral (2014) and The Dark Tapes (2016). Ares played Natalie in Mr. Invincible alongside Bill Engvall and Alyson Stoner. Ares also appeared in Will Wernick's anticipated Escape Room follow-up, No Escape (2020).

Television
For Ares's first television appearance, she landed the role of Anastasia on Unstrung, an ABC Family one-hour pilot from Life Unexpected executive producer Emily Whitesell.

Ares had a guest star role, under the name Emilia Ares, in the second season of detective TV series Bosch from Amazon Studios. The series is based on the novels centered on the character of the same name by Michael Connelly. The second season of the series was released on Amazon Prime Video on 11 March 2016. Ares portrayed Grand Duchess Anastasia Nikolaevna of Russia in the Fox series American Horror Story.

Filmography

Film

Television

Music videos

Producer

References

External links
 
 

Living people
Armenian film actresses
American film actresses
Armenian television actresses
American television actresses
21st-century Armenian actresses
21st-century American actresses
Actresses from Yerevan
Armenian emigrants to the United States
University of California, Los Angeles alumni
Date of birth missing (living people)
Year of birth missing (living people)